This is a list of the National Register of Historic Places listings in Tarrant County, Texas.

This is intended to be a complete list of the properties and districts listed on the National Register of Historic Places in Tarrant County, Texas. There are 23 districts and 91 individual properties listed on the National Register in the county. Another two properties were once listed but have been removed while a third property has been relocated outside the county. One individually listed property is both a State Antiquities Landmark (SAL) and a Recorded Texas Historic Landmark (RTHL) while an additional property is an SAL. Two districts and 35 individual properties are RTHLs. One district contains additional SALs and RTHLs while six districts hold more RTHLs.

Current listings

The locations of National Register properties and districts may be seen in a mapping service provided.

|}

Former listings

|}

See also

National Register of Historic Places listings in Texas
Recorded Texas Historic Landmarks in Tarrant County

References

External links

 
Tarrant